Ruth Isabel Winch (née Legh, 25 August 1870 – 9 January 1952) was a British tennis player who won a bronze medal at the 1908 Summer Olympics in London.

Winch had a walkover in both round one and the quarter finals of the 1908 women's singles competition, in the semi-final she lost to Dorothea Chambers 6–1, 6–1.

Between 1899 and 1922 Winch participated in nine editions of the Wimbledon Championships. Her best results in the singles event were achieved in 1904 and 1919 when she reached the quarterfinal.

In March 1907 she won the singles title at the Championship of Cannes after defeating Toupie Lowther in the final in straight sets.

References

External links
 
 

1870 births
1952 deaths
English female tennis players
Olympic bronze medallists for Great Britain
Olympic tennis players of Great Britain
Tennis players at the 1908 Summer Olympics
Olympic medalists in tennis
Medalists at the 1908 Summer Olympics
British female tennis players
People from Ryde
Sportspeople from the Isle of Wight